The 2019 Thailand motorcycle Grand Prix was the fifteenth round of the 2019 MotoGP season. It was held at the Buriram International Circuit in Buriram on 6 October 2019. Marc Márquez won the MotoGP race, ensuring his sixth world title in the class and fourth in a row.

Classification

MotoGP

Moto2

Moto3

 Gabriel Rodrigo suffered a broken foot in a crash during warm-up session and was declared unfit to compete.

Championship standings after the race

MotoGP

Moto2

Moto3

Notes

References

External links

Thailand
Motorcycle Grand Prix
Thailand motorcycle Grand Prix
Thailand motorcycle Grand Prix